Estcoin was a 2017 proposal for a national cryptocurrency tied to Estonia's e-residency program. The plan was criticized by European Central Bank President Mario Draghi, who said "no member state can introduce its own currency". In 2018, the Estonian government clarified it was not planning to launch a national cryptocurrency and that it never planned to do so, but would plan to "explore various possibilities" for blockchain technology.

See also
 e-Residency of Estonia
 Estonia

References

Cryptocurrency projects
Internet in Estonia
ont